Shruti Nagvanshi is an Indian women's and child's rights activist and an advocate for marginalized groups in India, including the untouchable caste known as Dalit and rural women. She is one of the founding members of People's Vigilance Committee on Human Rights (PVCHR) and a founder of Savitri Bai Phule Mahila Panchayat, a women’s forum. She has worked with several other projects to empower minorities.

She founded the People's Vigilance Committee on Human Rights (PVCHR) in 1996, with her husband Lenin Raghuvanshi, historian Mahendra Pratap, musician Vikash Maharaj, and poet Gyanedra Pati. Both she and Lenin are converts to Buddhism. She was nominated for the Nobel Peace Prize for her contributions to bettering conditions for world peace and for acting as a driving force to prevent the use of masculinity-driven militarist traditions as a weapon of war and conflict.

Personal life
Shruti Nagvanshi was born on 2 January 1974 in the Dashashwmedh area of the Varanasi district in the state of Uttar Pradesh. Inspired by her mother’s encouragement towards a better education, she overcame obstacles and completed her education. She married Dr Lenin Raghuvanshi on 22 February 1992. Their only son, Kabeer Karunik, plays snooker at the national level.

Initial Years
Once Nagvanshi left home to attend college, she realized how lack of opportunity restricts human desire to achieve goals in life. It was this self-belief which gave her the courage to participate in social work, learn, and develop awareness of the world. Her mother remained an inspiration to her to help others grow.  She was part of several local social work programmes and later became involved in the Uttar Pradesh chapter of the United Nations Youth Organisation. Marriage in an orthodox hierarchy-conforming family helped her to understand the mind of caste from close proximity. With the formation of JMN/PVCHR she decided to devote herself to her passion and would walk kilometers on foot to reach to the interior villages inhabited by untouchables.

Anti-caste work
She is involved in building relations between various communities through modelling and teaching awareness of individual rights and the rule of law. Her organization PVCHR focuses on reconciliation between the historically marginalized and historically privileged, and represents a secular and right-leaning wing of the larger anti-caste activist movement. Nagvanshi believes the very thought that they can fight against injustice is empowering. This pursuit of empowerment brought structural changes in her adopted villages and intervention areas. Her work has led to increased accessibility to health, education, livelihood and welfare services.  Many people from upper castes in India are beginning to embrace an inclusive society.

On malnutrition and children's right to survival
In 2017, she and her team at JanMitra Nyas chose 50 villages and some slums in the most marginalised communities in four blocks of the Varanasi district to work on the issue of children’s health with the support of Child Rights and You (CRY). Maternal, neonatal, and malnourished death declined in these communities.

Recognition
Shruti received the Rex Karmveer Chakra (silver) in 2019. Her work has been acknowledged by film actor Aamir Khan and she has been invited to participate in Satyamev Jayate TV series , a TV show hosted by Aamir Khan that discussed issue of rape that went on air in 2014. Indian poet, lyricist and screenwriter Javed Akhtar honored her with the Jan Mitra Award in 2000 at Kabeer Mela (Kabeer festival) to recognize her extraordinary work for communal harmony and promotion of Kabir teaching. She was awarded the Top 100 Women Achievers of India in 2016 by the Union Ministry of Women and Child Development (MWCD) and Facebook jointly in the category of ‘Access to Justice Protecting Women and their rights'. She received the Tilaka Manjhi National award with Lenin Raghuvanshi by the Ang Madad Foundation, an NGO based in Bhagalpur, Bihar for her work on Dalit women's rights. Two Dalit rights activists from Varanasi, Uttar Pradesh, Mrs Shruti Nagvanshi and Mr Lenin Raghuvanshi have been mentioned as “21st Century Heroes of India” from the perspective of Liberty, Equality, Fraternity and other Indian Constitutional Values by Pippa Rann Books & Media, based in the United Kingdom. Shruti received Public Peace prize 2020-21 for extraordinary work for child rights and women rights. Nagvanshi has been awarded the following national and international honours since 2021:
 2021:On 15 August 2021, India Times  Hindi edition listed Nagvanshi as one of the 11 Human Rights Activists in India whose Life Mission is to provide others With A Dignified Life.
 2022: Savitri Bai Phule Nation award for women empowerment and resilience by Savitri Bai Phule Foundation with hand of an eminent author Sharankumar Limbale
 2022:  Personality of week by Bahujan Samvad
 2023:  One of selected magnificent Women Leaders to look upto in 2023

Literary and academic contribution 
Shruti frequently contributes articles to newsletters and online websites.
Her latest book with academic Dr. Archana Kaushik is Margins to Centre Stage: Empowering Dalits in India.

References

Living people
Converts to Buddhism from Hinduism
Indian Buddhists
Indian human rights activists
Dalit activists
Indian former Hindus
1974 births